Brian Michael Broderick (born September 1, 1986) is an American former professional baseball pitcher. He played in Major League Baseball (MLB) for the Washington Nationals.

Career

St. Louis Cardinals
Broderick graduated from Washington (Arizona) High School in 2005.  He attended Mesa Community College and posted a 7 - 2 record with a 2.51 ERA in 2006.  Broderick attended Grand Canyon University the next year, posting a 6 - 5 record in a 3.65 ERA in 14 starts during the 2007 season. Broderick was drafted by the St. Louis Cardinals in the 21st round of the 2007 Major League Baseball Draft.

Washington Nationals
He was selected by the Washington Nationals in the Rule 5 draft before the 2011 season. However, he was designated for assignment on May 14.

Second Stint with Cardinals
He was returned to the Cardinals on May 23.

On July 21, 2012, the Cardinals announced they had released Broderick from Triple-A.

Second Stint with Nationals
He signed a minor league contract with the Nationals on July 23, and was assigned to the Double-A Harrisburg Senators.

Arizona Diamondbacks
Broderick signed a minor league deal with the Arizona Diamondbacks in January 2014.

Kansas City Royals
After pitching for the Sugar Land Skeeters of the independent Atlantic League of Professional Baseball in 2014, Broderick signed a minor league contract with the Los Angeles Angels of Anaheim after the 2014 season. The Angels traded Broderick to the Kansas City Royals for Johnny Giavotella on December 19, 2014. He became a free agent on November 6, 2015.

See also
Rule 5 draft results

References

External links

1986 births
Living people
Baseball players from Phoenix, Arizona
Major League Baseball pitchers
Washington Nationals players
Johnson City Cardinals players
Batavia Muckdogs players
Quad Cities River Bandits players
Palm Beach Cardinals players
Springfield Cardinals players
Memphis Redbirds players
Harrisburg Senators players
Sugar Land Skeeters players
Surprise Rafters players
Gulf Coast Nationals players
Omaha Storm Chasers players